The Onion Movie (released in some countries as News Movie) is a 2008 American comedy film written by The Onion writers Robert D. Siegel and Todd Hanson. It was filmed in 2003 and released on June 3, 2008, direct-to-video. It is Rodney Dangerfield's final film role, prior to his death in October 2004.

Plot 
The plot revolves around a fictitious Onion television news anchorman, Norm Archer (Len Cariou). He is forced to face a corporate takeover by Onions perennial multinational, Global Tetrahedron. Onion news is described as "fair and balanced". The plot is a springboard for various comedy sketches featuring The Onions satire. Vignettes include music videos parodies of Britney Spears, and Steven Seagal parodying the action hero genre he normally portrays. The plot is interrupted by film reviewers and commentators weighing in on its progress, with one staging an immediate walkout of all African American audience members unless a positive portrayal of an African American is inserted into the plot.

Cast

Production
In 2003, New Regency Productions and Fox Searchlight Pictures were on board to produce and release a movie written by The Onion staff. Tentatively titled The Untitled Onion Movie, it was to be directed by music video director Tom Kuntz and Mike Maguire and written by then Onion editor Robert Siegel and writer Todd Hanson with the rest of the Onion staff. After delays and previews to test audiences, the film was suspended and eventually dropped by Fox. New Regency Productions continued the project.

On March 15, 2007, Scott Aukerman said that the Onion movie was at a "dead standstill". Additionally, Onion, Inc. President at the time, Sean Mills, indicated The Onion was no longer associated with the film project.

In November 2007, then-President Sean Mills told Wikinews that the film was a dead project. Although Fox Searchlight had an option to release it on DVD, there was no immediate announcement to do so. Eventually, the trailer appeared on the DVD for The Darjeeling Limited. The trailer also appeared on the Hitman, Charlie Bartlett, and Aliens vs. Predator: Requiem DVDs.

20th Century Fox Home Entertainment released The Onion Movie DVD on June 3, 2008. The UK release's packaging styles the film News Movie, a.k.a. The Onion Movie.

Reception
The Onions own non-satirical entertainment website The A.V. Club did not review the film. The site's film critic Nathan Rabin explicitly declined to review the film for his "Dispatches from Direct to DVD Purgatory" feature on poor-quality direct-to-DVD films because he wished to avoid a conflict of interest.

References

External links

2008 direct-to-video films
2008 films
Movie
2008 comedy films
American comedy films
Regency Enterprises films
3 Arts Entertainment films
2000s English-language films
2000s American films